ATP-binding cassette sub-family A member 9 is a protein that in humans is encoded by the ABCA9 gene.

Function 

This gene is a member of the superfamily of ATP-binding cassette (ABC) transporters and the encoded protein contains two transmembrane domains and two nucleotide binding folds. ABC proteins transport various molecules across extra- and intracellular membranes. ABC genes are divided into seven distinct subfamilies ( ABC1, MDR/TAP, MRP, ALD, OABP, GCN20, and White). This gene is a member of the ABC1 subfamily and is clustered with four other ABC1 family members on chromosome 17q24. Transcriptional expression of this gene is induced during monocyte differentiation into macrophages and is suppressed by cholesterol import.

References

Further reading

External links